Various may refer to:

 Various (band), an English dubstep/electronic music duo
 Various artists, a term for a compilation album containing pieces by various musicians
 Various authors, a book containing works by several writers
 The Various, a children's fantasy novel by Steve Augarde

See also
 Various & Gould, a Berlin-based artist duo
 Various Artists – Archives Vol. 4, an album by Steve Vai
 Various Failures, a compilation album by American experimental rock band Swans
 The Various Haunts of Men, a novel by Susan Hill
 Various Positions, an album by Leonard Cohen
 Various Positions Tour
 Various Positions (film), a 2002 film directed by Ori Kowarsky
 Varius (disambiguation)